Lieutenant General Nathu Singh Rathore was an Indian Army officer from Gumanpura, Rajasthan.

Early years

Singh was born in 1900, although official records say he was born on 10 May 1902 at Gumanpura in the princely state of Dungarpur. He was the only son of Thakur Hamir Singhji of Gumanpura. He was a descendant of Jaimal Rathore who fought for Mewar against Akbar. Singh lost his parents at a young age and was then taken under the wing of Maharawal Vijay Singh of Dungarpur.

Singh was educated at Mayo College and was nicknamed Baghi (Rebel) by his peers. He was later sent to the Royal Military College, Sandhurst in England to be trained as an officer to serve in the Mewar Army, on the request of Rajmata of Dungarpur.

Career 

Singh was the second Indian officer to graduate from the Royal Military Academy, Sandhurst after General Rajendrasinhji Jadeja who went on to become a three-star general. After serving in the Mewar Army, he was commissioned in the 1/7 Rajput Regiment in 1925. He served at various places including Afghanistan and the Deccan. At Staff College Camberley, he scored a still-record 935 out of 1000 in Strategy. He served as a Division Commander in Burma during World War II.

He climbed the military hierarchy and in 1947 was offered the post of Commander-in-Chief of the Indian army to replace the retiring General Roy Bucher by Sardar Baldev Singh, the defence minister at the time.
He declined, stating that General K. M. Cariappa was senior to him and more eligible for the post. He was instead appointed first as the Inspector-General of Training and Evaluation, and then in 1951 as the commander of the Eastern Army, a post he held till 1954.

References

Bibliography 
 

Indian generals
1900 births
Rajasthani people
Year of death missing
Graduates of the Royal Military College, Sandhurst
People from Dungarpur